Scott Bain (born 22 November 1991) is a Scottish professional footballer who plays as a goalkeeper for Celtic. He has previously played for Aberdeen, Elgin City, Alloa Athletic and Dundee.

Club career

Aberdeen
Bain began his footballing career at Aberdeen's academy. Shortly after his promotion to the first team, he was loaned to Elgin City, where he made his professional debut. In May 2011, Bain was released by Aberdeen.

Alloa Athletic
In June 2011, Bain signed a one-year contract with Scottish Third Division side Alloa Athletic. He established himself as a first-team regular, and helped the club to consecutive promotions in his first two seasons.

Dundee
On 29 May 2014, Bain signed a three-year contract with Dundee. He made his debut on 26 August 2014, in a 4–0 win against Raith Rovers in the Scottish League Cup. Bain made a first league appearance for Dundee in October 2014, when Kyle Letheren was injured during a pre-match exercise. On 6 April 2015, he signed a new contract with Dundee, extending his deal with the club until 2018. Bain was dropped from the Dundee first team squad by manager Neil McCann in November 2017, for unspecified disciplinary reasons.

Hibernian (loan)
On 1 January 2018, it was announced that Bain had joined Hibernian on loan until the end of the 2017–18 season. Hibernian cancelled the loan on 31 January, which allowed Bain to join Celtic instead.

Celtic
Bain joined Celtic on 31 January 2018, initially on loan from Dundee. Celtic needed another goalkeeper to provide competition for Dorus de Vries, following an injury to Craig Gordon. Bain made his first appearance for Celtic on 11 March, in a 3–2 win against Rangers, after de Vries suffered an injury in training.

With his contract with Dundee due to expire at the end of the 2017–18 season, Bain signed a four-year contract with Celtic in May 2018. Bain played regularly for Celtic after the January 2019 winter break.

In October 2019, he signed a new one-year contract with the club.

International career
Due to an injury to Allan McGregor, Scotland manager Gordon Strachan called Bain into the national squad for a friendly with Qatar and a UEFA Euro 2016 qualifying match with the Republic of Ireland in June 2015.

Bain was recalled to the squad in May 2018 for friendly matches against Peru and Mexico, after McGregor again dropped out through injury. He made his first full international appearance on 2 June 2018, in a 1–0 defeat against Mexico. His second cap came in a 3–0 defeat against Kazakhstan in Euro 2020 qualification.

Career statistics

Honours
Celtic
Scottish Premiership: 2017–18, 2018–19, 2019–20, 2021–22
Scottish Cup: 2017–18, 2018–19
Scottish League Cup: 2018–19, 2021–22, 2022–23

References

External links
 
 
 
 

1991 births
Living people
Footballers from Edinburgh
Scottish footballers
Scotland international footballers
Association football goalkeepers
Aberdeen F.C. players
Elgin City F.C. players
Alloa Athletic F.C. players
Dundee F.C. players
Hibernian F.C. players
Celtic F.C. players
Scottish Football League players
Scottish Professional Football League players